Fahardine Hassani (born 7 November 1993) is a Comorian professional footballer who plays as a goalkeeper for the Comoros national football team.

Hassani spent his entire youth playing for Olympque de Vaulx, and joined Football Bourg-en-Bresse Péronnas 01 as the reserve goalkeeper. After a successful debut season with CS Bourgoin-Jallieu in 2017, Hassani earned a callup to the Comoros national football team.

International career
Hassani made his debut for the Comoros national football team in a 3-0 loss in the 2018 COSAFA Cup to Mozambique on 29 May 2018.

References

External links
 
 NFT Profile

1997 births
Living people
Citizens of Comoros through descent
Comorian footballers
Comoros international footballers
French footballers
French sportspeople of Comorian descent
Association football goalkeepers
Football Bourg-en-Bresse Péronnas 01 players
Lyon La Duchère players
CS Bourgoin-Jallieu players
SO Châtellerault players